Digital Music News is an American online magazine. It provides coverage ranging from tidbits to everyday reporting to major stories.

The magazine has criticized hate groups, gone to court and "protected .. right to privacy", and written about family values and Black Lives Matter.

Overview
Digital Music News was founded by Paul Resnikoff. The site serves as a news source and a source of "to quote from". At times, they're the "first reported by".

Some of its data on the economics of the industry has been used by others such as The Wall Street Journal and The Economist regarding trends. The site has been described by The New York Times as an industry blog.

In 2012 it was in the middle of a protection-of-journalistic-sources lawsuit, and they've reported on other legal matters. For some of their stories, they act as a news aggregator, but they also serve as the source for such aggregation by major newspapers such as The New York Times and news magazines such as Newsweek and Wired. In 2017, The Atlanta Journal-Constitution wrote, regarding a Digital Music News story reporting a Southern Poverty Law Center (SPLC) finding about online music hate groups, that "Less than 24 hours after the article was published, Spotify scrapped the music from its platform."

Features
Aside from doing popularity and "Top 10" stories, they also look into industry-related topics and industry history. A 2005 MacWorld opinion piece about piracy and pricing centered around a Digital Music News column stating "The real boogeyman may be in the pricing." In 2018, BBC's "YouTube's neo-Nazi music problem" had three paragraphs describing the timeliness of investigation and reporting by Digital Music News.

Their email newsletter is called Daily Snapshot.

Competition
Their reporting competes with sources such as Webnoize but they each specialize differently. FutureMusic.com is another competitor. FYI Music News, a Canadian website that coopetates with them, reprints some of their material.

Criticism
Franklin Graves, a 2010 Samford University graduate and corporate counsel for Naxos Music Group, claimed in 2015 that "Everyone knows DigitalMusicNews.com is extremely biased and heavy with click-bait links".

References

External links
 
 Gadgetspage 'Top 40' (DMN is #36)

Online music magazines published in the United States
Magazines established in 2004